{| class=infobox style=width:22em
| colspan="3" style="background: LightSteelBlue; text-align:center;" | Australian Idol Music Releases |-
| Genres || pop, dance-pop, pop rock, synthpop, indie pop, pop punk, rock, soft rock, country rock, R&B, urban, soul, covers, jazz, folk, alternative, country
|-
| Years || 2003 – present 
|-
| Record labels || BMG, Sony Music Australia, Warner Music Group, Universal Music, EMI, RCA, Ministry of Sound, Shock Records, Rajon, Decca Records Australia, Scorpio Music
|-
| Charting regions || Australia, Austria, Belgium, France, Germany, Iceland, Ireland, Japan, Netherlands, New Zealand, Norway, Sweden, Switzerland, UK, US
|-
|} 
Australian Idol was a televised talent contest, screened on Channel Ten for seven seasons between 2003 and 2009. Several contestants were signed to record labels, while others released their music independently. Since 2003 Australian Idol acts have placed well on the Australian music charts, with 35 number ones and 158 platinum and 41 gold certifications.Album and Single Accreditations 1997–2016 . Australian Recording Industry Association. Retrieved 17 January 2016. Eight Idol releases appeared in the 2000 – 2009 ARIA End of Decade Charts, and 24 releases have been nominated for Highest Selling ARIA Music Awards.Winners by Award – Highest Selling Album. ARIA Awards. Archived from the original on 24 January 2012.Winners of the 2011 ARIA Awards.Sydney Morning Herald. 27 November 2011. Archived from the original on 30 November 2012. Idol contestants have also been nominated for 33 ARIA Awards in public vote categories, where the nominees are most commonly selected from the highest selling acts of the year. There have also been 48 industry judged ARIA Award nominations. To date there have been 11 wins in sales and public vote categories, and in 2013 season one winner Guy Sebastian and season four runner up Jessica Mauboy became the first Idol contestants to win industry voted ARIA Awards.WINNERS & NOMINEES ANNOUNCED Aria Awards. 3 October 2012. Archived from the original on 2 October 2012.Baroni, Nastassia (7 October 2015).Courtney Barnett, Hermitude, Tame Impala Lead 2015 ARIA Award Nominations. musicfeeds.com.au. Archived from the original on 7 October 2015.Gallagher, Allison  (10 October 2019). Here Are All The 2019 ARIA Awards Nominations.MusicFeeds. Retrieved 10 October 2019.

While many of the contestants only charted with their early releases, some, most notably Sebastian, Mauboy, season one runner up Shannon Noll, season two runner up Anthony Callea and season five runner up Matt Corby have experienced long-term success. Nine Idol acts have charted outside Australia, including Noll and Leith who reached the top ten on the Irish charts with their debut singles, and Sebastian and season seven winner Stan Walker who have both achieved numerous top ten certified entries on the New Zealand charts.Stan Walker Discography – New Zealand Charts . RIANZ Charts archives. Hung Medien. Retrieved 24 January 2012. Sebastian is currently the only Australian Idol contestant to chart in the US. "Battle Scars", a collaboration with Lupe Fiasco, reached number 71 on the Billboard Hot 100 Chart, 23 on the Billboard Digital Song Chart and number one on the  R&B/Hip-Hop Digital Song Chart.Adams, Cameron (11 September 2012)Guy Sebastian's ARIA number one song Battle Scars with Lupe Fiasco hits 73 on the US Billboard Hot 100.news.com.au. Archived from the original on 29 January 2013. It spent 20 weeks in the Hot 100 and has been certified platinum for sales of one million.Gold Platinum searchable database. Recording Industry Association of America. Retrieved 6 November 2016  "Battle Scars" also reached number two in Norway. In January 2013 Ricki-Lee Coulter's "Do It Like That" reached number seven on the Japan Hot 100.

Australian releases

The most successful season of Australian Idol was the first one in 2003, with the contestants achieving 19 of the 35 Australian Idol number ones, and almost half the certifications.Guy Sebastian – Discography     . ARIA Chart archives. Hung Medien. Retrieved 9 December 2011 Season one winner Guy Sebastian has been the most commercially successful Australian Idol contestant, with season four runner up Jessica Mauboy second. They are followed by season one runner up Shannon Noll, season five runner up Matt Corby, season two runner up Anthony Callea, and season four winner Damien Leith.Anthony Callea – Discography  . ARIA Chart archives. Hung Medien. Retrieved 9 December 2011 These contestants have all achieved multiple chart entries and certifications. Eleven other contestants have had two or more certified top 50 releases as solo artists. Following are lists of albums, singles and DVDs released by Australian Idol contestants, including ARIA Chart peaks and runs, certifications, and any Australian chart records these releases hold.

2003 Australian Idol (Season one)
Winner – Guy Sebastian
Runner up – Shannon NollAlbumsEPsSingles2004 Australian Idol (Season two)
Winner – Casey Donovan 
Runner up – Anthony CalleaAlbumsEPsSingles2005 Australian Idol (Season three)
Winner – Kate DeAraugo
Runner up – Emily WilliamsAlbumsEPsSingles2006 Australian Idol (Season four)
Winner – Damien Leith
Runner up – Jessica MauboyAlbumsEPsSingles2007 Australian Idol (Season five)
Winner – Natalie Gauci
Runner up – Matt CorbyAlbumsEPsSingles2008 Australian Idol (Season six)
Winner – Wes Carr
Runner up – Luke DickensAlbumsEPsSingles2009 Australian Idol (Season seven)
Winner – Stan Walker
Runner up – Hayley WarnerAlbumsEPsSinglesYoung Divas
The Young Divas was a group of four female contestants from various Idol years, active during 2006 and 2007. Originally the group was made up of Season One finalist Paulini, Season Two finalist Ricki-Lee Coulter, and Season Three winner and runner up Kate DeAraugo and Emily Williams. After the first album Coulter left the group and was replaced by Season Four runner up Jessica Mauboy. The group disbanded after the second album.AlbumsSinglesAlbum and single certification totals
 Current ARIA Accreditation levels for album and singles:
Gold: 35,000 units
Platinum: 70,000 unitsRelease history and total certificationsAlbum certificationsEP certificationsSingle certificationsAustralian Idol DVDs
Current ARIA Accreditation levels for DVDs:
Gold: 7,500 units
Platinum: 15,000 units

Chart achievements

Australian Idol recordsHighest selling Australian Idol albums[a]
 Just as I Am, Guy Sebastian – 6× platinum
 That's What I'm Talking About, Shannon Noll – 5× platinum
 The Winner's Journey, Damien Leith – 4× platinum
 Lift, Shannon Noll – 3× platinum
 For You, Casey Donovan – 3× platinum

Note a ^ Just as I Am had documented retail sales of 480,000, just short of 7× platinumSams, Christine. (8 November 2010).How I beat bullies of rock'n'roll. The Sydney Morning Herald. Archived from the original on 25 January 2012.Best chart runs – Albums
Most weeks at number one – The Winner's Journey, Damien Leith (5 weeks)
Most weeks in top ten – That's What I'm Talking About, Shannon Noll and Armageddon, Guy Sebastian (14 weeks) 
Most weeks in top 50 – Been Waiting, Jessica Mauboy (59 weeks)Highest selling Australian Idol EP Into the Flame, Matt Corby – 6× platinumBest chart runs – EPsHighest peak – Into the Flame,  Matt Corby (number three)
Most weeks in top ten –  Into the Flame,  Matt Corby (2 weeks)
Most weeks in top 50 – Into the Flame,  Matt Corby (36 weeks)Highest selling Australian Idol'' singles

 "Battle Scars", Guy Sebastian (feat. Lupe Fiasco) – 12× platinum
 "Angels Brought Me Here", Guy Sebastian – 5× platinum
 "Who's That Girl", Guy Sebastian (feat. Eve) – 5× platinum
 "Don't Worry Be Happy", Guy Sebastian – 5× platinum
 "The Prayer", Anthony Callea – 4× platinum
 "What About Me", Shannon Noll – 4× platinum
"Like it Like That", Guy Sebastian – 4× platinum
 "Like a Drum", Guy Sebastian – 4× platinum
 "Choir", Guy Sebastian – 4× platinum

Best chart runs – Singles
Most weeks at number one – "Battle Scars", Guy Sebastian featuring Lupe Fiasco(6 weeks)
Most weeks in top ten – "These Kids", Joel Turner (15 weeks)
Most weeks in top 50 – "This Time I Know It's for Real", Young Divas (30 weeks)

Australian chart records
Guy Sebastian's album Just as I Am – Second highest one week sales ever recorded in Australia, and the highest for an Australian artist. Sold 163,711 units in its first week of release.Adams, Cameron (29 December 2009). Susan Boyle's album smashes sales records Herald Sun. Archived from the original on 21 January 2012.
Guy Sebastian – Only male Australian artist to achieve six number one singles in Australian chart history, and he is third overall for all Australian acts. Only Kylie Minogue and Delta Goodrem have achieved more.Ryan, Gavin (19 August 2012).Guy Sebastian Equals Abba For Number 1 Hits In Australia. Noise11. Archived from the original on 19 August 2012.
Shannon Noll – Noll's first ten singles released between 2004 and 2007 all reached the top ten of the ARIA Singles Chart, making him the only male Australian artist to achieve ten consecutive top ten singles in Australian chart history. John Farnham, Jimmy Barnes and Sebastian have all achieved more than ten, but they were nonconsecutive.
Guy Sebastian's single "Angels Brought Me Here" – Held the record of being the highest selling Australian artist song of all time until 2011. Prior to 2003 the highest recorded sales for an Australian artist song were for John Farnham's 1968 single "Sadie (The Cleaning Lady)" with sales of 180,000+ units. "Angels Brought Me Here" became the first Australian artist song in chart history to reach 4× platinum certification and eventually achieved 5× platinum certification in 2019. It remained the highest selling Australian artist song until its sales were surpassed by Gotye's "Somebody That I Used to Know" in 2011. Since then a number of other Australian songs have also reached much higher than 4× platinum certification, including Sebastian's own single "Battle Scars" featuring Lupe Fiasco which has achieved 12× platinum certification.
Anthony Callea's single "The Prayer" – Highest one week single sales for both an Australian artist and an artist on debut, and second highest one week sales in Australian Chart history for any artist, behind Elton John's Princess Diana tribute "Candle in the Wind".Cashmere, Paul (29 December 2004)Anthony Callea Beats Guy Sebastian.undercover.com.au. Archived from the original on 31 December 2004. Retrieved 4 February 2012. "The Prayer" sold over 147,000 copies in its first full week of sales. Sebastian has the second highest one week sales for an Australian artist and third overall with 128,679 copies of "Angels Brought Me Here" sold in its first week.

End of Decade Charts
In January 2010 the Australian Recording Industry Association released a report of the 100 highest selling singles and albums of the decade 2000 – 2009. Eight idol releases featured in the lists. Australian Idol contestants had three of the five highest selling singles of the decade, with only one other Australian song in the top twenty.  Guy Sebastian and Matt Corby also appeared in the highest selling releases of the 2010 – 2019 decade.ARIA END OF DECADE SINGLES CHART. ARIA Awards. Retrieved 11 January 2020.

2000 – 2009

2010 – 2019

ARIA Music Awards

As well as administering the official Australian music charts, ARIA also holds the annual ARIA Music Awards to recognise excellence, innovation and achievement in Australian music. The awards have industry judged and  highest selling categories, and since 2010 public vote categories where the criteria for selection as a nominee is most commonly being one of the highest selling acts during the year.Public vote – Category definitions.Australian Recording Industry Association (ARIA). Archived from the original on 3 October 2012. Australian Idol contestants have been nominated for 105 ARIA Awards since 2004, with 24 highest selling nominations, 33 nominations for publicly voted categories, and 48 industry judged nominations. Guy Sebastian has received the most nominations with 34, including seven wins.ARIA Nominations. Australian Recording Industry Association. 28 September 2010. Archived from the original on 21 January 2012.Smith, Sarah (6 October 2014). Chet Faker and Violent Soho lead 2014 ARIA nominations. Faster Louder. Archived from the original on 7 October 2014.Here are all the winners from the 2019 ARIA Awards.The Music Network. 27 November 2019. Retrieved 28 November 2019. Jessica Mauboy has had 28 nominations including two wins, and Matt Corby ten nominations with two wins. Shannon Noll has received six nominations.Spotlight::2005 ARIA Awards. Mediasearch. Archived from the original on 25 January 2012.The Full ARIA Award 2017 Nominees List Is Here themusic.com.au. 10 October 2017. Retrieved 2 September 2017 In 2013 Sebastian and Mauboy became the first Idol contestants to win industry voted ARIA Awards. Sebastian for Best Pop Release, and Mauboy for Best Female Artist.

International releases

Nine Australian Idol contestants have charted outside of Australia with at least one release, in countries including New Zealand, Ireland, Germany, Norway and the UK. Stan Walker and Guy Sebastian have achieved multiple chart entries and certifications in New Zealand. Sebastian has also achieved three certified singles in Sweden, and is currently the only Australian Idol contestant to chart in the United States. "Battle Scars", a collaboration with Lupe Fiasco, reached number 71 on the Billboard Hot 100 Chart, number 23 on the Billboard Digital Song Chart and number one on the R&B/Hip-Hop Digital Song Chart. The song spent 20 weeks in the Hot 100, and has been certified platinum for sales of one million. In January 2013 Ricki-Lee Coulter's "Do It Like That" reached number seven on the Japan Hot 100. Matt Corby's debut album Telluric'' charted in four European countries in 2016.

Current New Zealand certification levels:
Gold 7,500
Platinum 15,000 

Current US certification levels:
Gold 500,000
Platinum 1,000,000

Current Swedish certification levels:
Gold 20,000
Platinum 40,000 
 
Albums

Singles[a]

Note a ^ Sebastian's single "Angels Brought Me Here" was released in Malaysia, Indonesia, the Philippines and Singapore. His official biography states the song reached number one in four Asian countries. There are no online records for this charting.

Footnotes
 ARIA Chart reports

References

Australian Idol
Australian Idol
Lists of songs by reality television contestants